James F. Holland (September 24, 1938 – June 10, 2020) was an American politician.

Holland was born in Nashua, New Hampshire and graduated from Nashua High School. He served in the United States Army during the Vietnam War. Holland served on the Nashua Police Force. Holland served on the Nashua City Council. Holland served in the New Hampshire House of Representatives in 1975 and 1976 and was a Republican. Holland died in Nashua, New Hampshire.

Notes

1938 births
2020 deaths
Politicians from Nashua, New Hampshire
Military personnel from New Hampshire
American police officers
New Hampshire city council members
Republican Party members of the New Hampshire House of Representatives